Timōrātus, also stylized as TIMŌRĀTUS, began in 2006, as a solo project of David Napier. The band was to begin as a metal band, but Napier, who had injured his hands, began the project with a more programmed electronic foundation. The band describes their style as "Multi-genre metal".

History
The project began in 2006, as a solo project of David Napier. Originally, he recorded a few songs with an electronic-based influence. The project debuted in 2006, with an EP called Afraid of the Light, which featured 5-electronic based songs. Three years past before the band's next release, an EP titled Signs & Peace, also very electronically influenced. By 2014, Timōrātus completely molded into its original vision of a metal band, releasing an EP, titled Black, which signified the style portrayed in the release. Only a few months after Blacks release, the project released a follow-up with a completely different premise, Death, which portrayed a death metal-style. In 2015, the project would release an electronically-influenced fuzz rock single, made for Napier's now-wife, Courtney, as a marriage proposal song depicted by the cover. Two more EPs would follow in the same year, titled Doom (doom metal-style) and Grind (grindcore-style). All of the EPs, were concept releases, following the story of man named Kafla. Following his quadruple EP release, Timōrātus released their debut studio album, Reverentia, which was released digitally for free. The album also marked the band's debut on Christian Metal Underground Records, the band's new record label. The album was the first to feature David's wife, Courtney on vocals. The album received very mixed reviews.

Timōrātus collaborated with another progressive metal act, Weapons of Indignation on a drone metal EP titled Compass, which featured both David Napier and Aleks Tengesdal working together on two tracks, with the release rounding out at around 17 minutes. The project's final release of 2017 was "Christmas Present Crisis", which presented several different styles, including grindcore, black metal, death metal, indie rock, hip hop and much more in a comical fashion. 2018 was a big year for the band, debuting in February with 7 Deadly Sins, a 7-minute grindcore EP, which debuted Courtney on harsh vocals. A single, "Screen Attack", came out in June, followed by the EP, For We Are Not Beasts, which released in July. It was later announced that Timōrātus would be featured on a four-way split grind EP, slated for release on September 8 through Christian Metal Underground Records, featuring Abandoned Mortuary, Eternal After Death and Wise As Serpents.

The band released a black metal split, with Symphony of Heaven and Bismoth titled Body of Christ, and it was released independently in March 2019, with Timōrātus’ portion of the EP containing many guest musicians, including Jake Martin (Taking the Head of Goliath), Luke Renno (Taking the Head of Goliath, Crimson Thorn, Temple of Perdition), Max Kevin Ølstoren (Shadow Puncher, Tunge Byrder), and Zack Plunkett (Abated Mass of Flesh, ex-Christageddon), as well as live drummer Mason Beard (Mystic Winter) contributing in addition. Later that year, the band would perform at Audiofeed Festival, sharing the stage with acts such as American Arson, Taking the Head of Goliath, Drottnar, and Crimson Moonlight. The band would also play three additional shows that year alongside Symphony of Heaven, Bleed the Masses, Shadows of Insanity, Malignant Vision, Pound, Hemwick, and Fall. On July 29, 2020, the band released their second album independently, My Life in a Mediocre Metal Band, a comedic metal album, featuring guest performances by Thompson and Beard, as well as Peter Watson of Elephant Watchtower and Eero Tertsunen of Renascent.

As of 2022 the band has released a follow up to their album My Life in a Mediocre Metal Band titled, My Life in a Made Metal Band which released June 10, 2022. It continues the comedy concept following the caricaturist version of Timōrātus as they sign a multi-million dollar record deal. It features guest performances by Thompson and Beard, as well as Krissy Vanderwoude of Whimsical, Peter Watson of Elephant Watchtower and Mac Smith of Krosis.

Influences and style
Timōrātus is a peculiar band as far as style; the band has produced several releases, each with several different genres that were focused on. The releases have covered the genres of black metal, death metal, grindcore, doom metal, drone metal, post-metal and blackgaze.

The band, having several different styles, have several different influences per style. However, the foundation of the project, is Extol. Other influences include Sunn O))), Jesu and Genghis Tron. On the band's For We Are Not Beasts EP, Genghis Tron, Rolo Tomassi and Arsonists Get All the Girls influenced the release.

Members
Current
David "The Party" Napier - all instruments, vocals (2006–present) (Symphony of Heaven, The Abrasive Realization, Color Crush)
Courtney "The Style" Napier - vocals (2017–present) (Color Crush)

Live
Logan "The Redneck" Thompson - guitars (2019–present) (Symphony of Heaven, The Abrasive Realization)
Mason "The Kid" Beard - drums (2019–present) (Mystic Winter, Symphony of Heaven, The Abrasive Realization)
"The Mystery" - bass (2020–present)
Jethro de Beer - bass (2019) (Bismoth, Be Not Betrayed)

Session
Benjamin Steven Dohrmann - vocals (2017)
Amy Austin - vocals (2017)
Carman Hammond - vocals (2017)
Bryan Powell - vocals (2017)
Eero Tertsunen - guitars (2019, 2020, 2022) (Renascent, Symphony of Heaven, The Slave Eye)
Peter Watson - guitars (2020, 2022) (Elephant Watchtower)

DiscographySingles "My Starshine" (2015)
 "Christmas Present Crisis" (2017)
 "Screen Attack" (2018)
 "Christmas Present Conundrum (Courtney's Crisis)" (2018)
 "Christmas Present Chaos (Bandmate's Confusion)" (2019)
"Best Show" (2020)
"Are We There Yet?" (2020)Compilations'''
 The Great Mortality (2018; Black, Death, Doom, & Grind'' EPs)

References

American Christian metal musical groups
American progressive metal musical groups
Extreme metal musical groups
Vision of God Records artists
Musical groups established in 2006
Heavy metal musical groups from Indiana